"Prettiest Thing" is a song recorded by English band the Creatures (aka singer Siouxsie Sioux and drummer Budgie). It was co-produced by Ian Caple.

It was the third single from their album Anima Animus. It was released in both vinyl and CD formats. The 10" vinyl contained "Prettiest Thing (Howie B's Hormonal Mix)" on side A and "Prettiest Thing (Subsonic Legacy Remix)" on side B. Of the two CD editions, CD1 included both remixes and an edit of the album version, while CD2 featured "Prettiest Thing (Superchumbo's Waking Dream Mix)", "Turn It On (Emperor Sly's Elemental Mix)" and "Guillotine (Bitten by the Black Dog)".

Uncut's Chris Roberts described "Prettiest Thing" as "a malevolent mini-movie".

Notes

1999 singles
The Creatures songs
1999 songs
Songs written by Siouxsie Sioux
Songs written by Budgie (musician)